The Battle of the Bronx is a college sports rivalry between Manhattan College and Fordham University, two NCAA Division I schools that play in The Bronx district of New York City. The rivalry dates back to the men's basketball teams playing in 1911 and has since grown into a multi-sport rivalry, and one of the largest intra-city college rivalries in New York City.

Manhattan play in the Metro Atlantic Athletic Conference, and Fordham play in the Atlantic 10 Conference.

History 
The history of the rivalry dates back to the 1911-12 NCAA basketball season when the Fordham Rams men's basketball and Manhattan Jaspers men's basketball programs squared off. The game was won by Manhattan 20-19, who would dominate the men's basketball series through the remainder of the 1910s. The series between the two basketball programs swayed over the course of the 20th century, with Manhattan dominating the series in the 1930s, 1950, and 1970s; while Fordham dominated the series in the 1920s and 1980s. The men's basketball series of the rivalry given it century-long longevity has been called one of the most storied rivalries in men's college basketball. The rivalry received extensive coverage in 2011 when they met for the 100th year.

In describing the rivalry former Manhattan guard, Tyler Wilson, said "You always have to play a team that's in your city. You always want to beat those teams — want to feel like you're the best team in your area." Chuba Ohams of Fordham said "It's gonna be fun, competitive — you know we're gonna play hard, go at each other."

The rivalry has expanded beyond men's basketball to include all sports programs that both Fordham and Manhattan sponsor. The women's basketball teams have played each other 50 times in their history, with their rivalry dating back to the 1980s.

Series table

Results

Men's basketball

Women's basketball

Baseball

Men's soccer

Women's soccer

See also 
 Fordham–St. John's rivalry

References

External links 
 Fordham Athletics
 Manhattan Athletics

College sports rivalries in the United States
College basketball rivalries in the United States
College soccer rivalries in the United States
Fordham Rams men's basketball
Manhattan Jaspers basketball
Fordham Rams women's basketball
Manhattan Lady Jaspers basketball
Fordham Rams men's soccer
Manhattan Jaspers soccer
Fordham Rams women's soccer
Manhattan Lady Jaspers soccer
Fordham Rams
Manhattan Jaspers and Lady Jaspers